Leandro Cuzzolino (born 21 May 1987) is an Argentine futsal player who plays for Levante UD FS and the Argentine national futsal team.

References

External links
FIFA profile
Divisione Calcio a 5 profile

1987 births
Living people
Argentine people of Italian descent
Argentine men's futsal players
Pan American Games silver medalists for Argentina
Futsal players at the 2007 Pan American Games
Medalists at the 2007 Pan American Games
Pan American Games medalists in futsal